The Rohilla Wars were a series of two wars fought in the Indian sub-continent between Rohilla Nation led by descendants of Ali Mohammad Khan and the British East India Company:

 First Rohilla War (1773–1774)
 Second Rohilla War (1794)

Wars involving India
Wars involving the British East India Company
Rohilla